Bahrs Landing Famous Seafood Restaurant and Marina (locally known as Bahrs Restaurant, Bahrs Landing, or simply Bahrs) is a seafood restaurant, bar and marina, located in Highlands, New Jersey.

Location and description
Established in 1917, Bahrs Restaurant is situated on the Sandy Hook Bay, overlooking Sandy Hook. The restaurant has a marina on the bay. Indoor and outdoor dining (with weather permitting) is available year round. On a clear day, patrons can see the New York Skyline and Verrazano-Narrows Bridge across the Sandy Hook Bay and Raritan Bay.  The Highlands-Sea Bright Bridge, which carries Route 36, is nearby the restaurant.

Bahrs was used as a location to film a Sopranos themed Super Bowl LVI commercial for Chevrolet.

See also
 List of seafood restaurants

References

External links

Marinas in the United States
Seafood restaurants in New Jersey
Buildings and structures in Monmouth County, New Jersey
Highlands, New Jersey
Restaurants established in 1917
1917 establishments in New Jersey